Amido Baldé  (born 16 May 1991) is a Guinea-Bissauan professional footballer who plays as a forward.

He started his career with Sporting CP, being loaned several times over the duration of his contract and winning the 2013 Portuguese Cup with Vitória de Guimarães. In 2013 he signed with Celtic, who also loaned him twice before he left for Metz two years later. After playing for Benfica Luanda in Angola, he returned to Portugal in the summer of 2016, when he joined Marítimo. In subsequent years he had a nomadic career, having brief spells at clubs in Albania, Libya, Indonesia and Vietnam.

Internationally, Baldé represented Portugal at youth level, helping the under-20 team finish second at the 2011 World Cup. In 2014, he decided to switch to playing for the country of his birth, Guinea-Bissau.

Club career

Sporting CP
Born in Bissau, Baldé started his career with Sporting CP's farm team in Guinea-Bissau, Sporting de Bissau. In 2008 he, alongside teammate Zezinho, moved to the Lisbon club to continue his development, helping it to back-to-back junior championships – of three in total in a row – scoring 13 goals in 29 games in 2008–09.

Baldé split the 2010–11 season, his first as a senior, between Santa Clara (second division) and Badajoz (Spanish third tier). Still owned by the Lions, he joined several Sporting teammates at Cercle Brugge in Belgium for the following campaign.

Vitória Guimarães
Baldé was released by Sporting in summer 2012. On 28 August he signed with fellow Primeira Liga side Vitória de Guimarães for two years. He made his debut on 21 September, coming on as a late substitute in a 1–0 away win against Moreirense. After a series of appearances from the bench, he scored in only his second game as a starter on 23 November, netting an injury time equaliser in a 2–2 draw at Beira-Mar.

Baldé appeared in 37 matches in all competitions in his only season, including seven Taça de Portugal games. He helped the Minho club win the tournament for the first time ever – he was replaced in the 90th minute of the final against Benfica, a 2–1 victory.

Celtic
On 13 June 2013, Baldé signed a four-year contract with Scottish Premier League champions Celtic. On arrival, he stated that his new team were "one of the best clubs in Europe and they are going to play in the Champions League." He made his official debut on 23 July, replacing James Forrest for the last 15 minutes of the second leg of the Champions League qualifier against Cliftonville.

Baldé scored his first competitive goal on 28 September 2013, coming in as a late substitute and netting the last goal in a 5–2 win at Kilmarnock. On 27 October, at Partick Thistle, he took the field in the 67th minute and scored the 2–1 winner eight minutes later. He failed to establish himself as a regular in the team, and although he made 20 league appearances over the season, most were as a substitute; his only other goal came in a 4–0 league victory over Kilmarnock, on 29 January 2014.

On 1 September 2014, Baldé joined Waasland-Beveren in the Belgian Pro League on a season-long loan. He made his debut twelve days later against Zulte Waregem, scoring his team's second goal in an eventual 4–1 away win, a spectacular half-volley from 40 yards out. It was to be his only competitive goal for the club, and in January 2015 he moved on loan again, this time to Hapoel Tel Aviv. He made 11 competitive appearances for the Israelis, failing to score in any of them.

In June 2015, Celtic agreed to terminate Baldé's contract despite there still being two years left to run.

Metz
On 16 July 2015, Baldé signed a two-year deal with Metz of the French Ligue 2. He made his debut on 1 August, in a 0–0 draw against Lens.

Baldé failed to find the net during his spell at the Stade Saint-Symphorien, in nine official games.

Benfica Luanda
After terminating his contract with Metz, Baldé moved teams and countries again on 14 January 2016 as he joined Benfica de Luanda in Angola for one and a half years. In his only season he scored a squad-best six goals to help them to a sixth-place finish in the Girabola, and left at the end of August 2016.

Marítimo
In August 2016, Baldé returned to European football and Portugal when he signed for Marítimo. On 26 March 2017, whilst on loan to fellow top division side Tondela, he was admitted to hospital due to a pulmonary embolism. Marítimo stopped paying his wages, claiming they did not have to pay him as he was unable to play, and he had to rely on assistance from the players' union to support himself and his family; by the end of the year, he was still not at full health.

Baldé travelled to South Africa in January 2018 for a trial with ABSA Premiership club Free State Stars, although doubts remained about his fitness.

Kukësi
On 1 February 2018, Baldé signed a six-month contract with Albanian Superliga side Kukësi. He made his debut 13 days later, coming on as a second-half substitute during a 1–0 defeat of KF Tirana in the quarter-finals of the Albanian Cup, his first competitive game of football in 11 months. His first league appearance took place on 19 February against Partizani when he took the field in injury time of a 3–1 win, Kukësi's first-ever at the opposition's ground.

Later career
Following a short spell in Libya with Al-Nasr, in February 2019 Baldé moved to Indonesia after agreeing to a deal at Persebaya. He scored five times in nine Liga 1 matches in the first half of the season, including a hat-trick in a 4–0 victory over Persib on 5 July 2019. He also finished joint-top scorer in the country's cup tournament, the Piala Indonesia, with ten goals along with PSM's Zulham Zamrun; however, the return of David da Silva to the team during the mid-season transfer window saw Baldé become surplus to requirements and on 31 August he signed for another Indonesian club, precisely PSM, scoring on his debut the following day to help the hosts beat Persela 2–1.

In January 2020, Baldé  moved to Vietnam to sign for Ho Chi Minh City. He made his debut on 21 January, in a 2–1 loss to Buriram United in a preliminary round of the AFC Champions League. That defeat saw his team drop into the AFC Cup, where the player scored three times in the group-stages; the opening goal in the 2–2 draw with Yangon United, and a brace in a 3–2 win against Hougang United. His first in the V.League 1 arrived on 23 June, in a 3–1 away defeat of Song Lam Nghe An.

Baldé had scored six goals in 14 games in all competitions for Ho Chi Minh City by August 2020. The club then looked to loan him out to other sides in Vietnam, but the player refused. As such, his contract was terminated by mutual agreement.

International career
Baldé chose to represent Portugal internationally. He was part of the under-20 squad that finished as runners-up at the 2011 FIFA World Cup in Colombia, but only saw seven minutes of action.

In May 2014, Baldé switched nationalities to Guinea-Bissau after being called up to the squad for the 2015 Africa Cup of Nations qualifier against the Central African Republic. He earned his first cap over a year later on 13 June 2015, playing the full 90 minutes in a 0–0 draw in Zambia in the 2017 Africa Cup of Nations qualifying phase.

Baldé scored his first goal for Guinea-Bissau on 8 October 2015 in a 2018 FIFA World Cup qualifier against Liberia, netting the equaliser in a 1–1 away draw.

Career statistics

Club

International
Scores and results list Guinea-Bissau's goal tally first, score column indicates score after each Baldé goal.

Honours
Vitória Guimarães
Taça de Portugal: 2012–13

Celtic
Scottish Premiership: 2013–14

Portugal U20
FIFA U-20 World Cup runner-up: 2011

Individual
Piala Indonesia top scorer: 2018–19 (ten goals)

Orders
 Knight of the Order of Prince Henry

References

External links

1991 births
Living people
Bissau-Guinean emigrants to Portugal
Naturalised citizens of Portugal
Portuguese sportspeople of Bissau-Guinean descent
Sportspeople from Bissau
Bissau-Guinean footballers
Portuguese footballers
Association football forwards
Primeira Liga players
Liga Portugal 2 players
Sporting CP footballers
C.D. Santa Clara players
Vitória S.C. players
C.S. Marítimo players
C.D. Tondela players
Segunda División B players
CD Badajoz players
Belgian Pro League players
Cercle Brugge K.S.V. players
S.K. Beveren players
Scottish Professional Football League players
Celtic F.C. players
Israeli Premier League players
Hapoel Tel Aviv F.C. players
Ligue 2 players
FC Metz players
Girabola players
S.L. Benfica (Luanda) players
Kategoria Superiore players
FK Kukësi players
Libyan Premier League players
Al-Nasr SC (Benghazi) players
Liga 1 (Indonesia) players
Persebaya Surabaya players
PSM Makassar players
V.League 1 players
Ho Chi Minh City FC players
Portugal youth international footballers
Guinea-Bissau international footballers
Bissau-Guinean expatriate footballers
Portuguese expatriate footballers
Expatriate footballers in Spain
Expatriate footballers in Belgium
Expatriate footballers in Scotland
Expatriate footballers in Israel
Expatriate footballers in France
Expatriate footballers in Angola
Expatriate footballers in Albania
Expatriate footballers in Libya
Expatriate footballers in Indonesia
Expatriate footballers in Vietnam
Portuguese expatriate sportspeople in Spain
Portuguese expatriate sportspeople in Belgium
Portuguese expatriate sportspeople in Scotland
Portuguese expatriate sportspeople in Israel
Portuguese expatriate sportspeople in Angola
Portuguese expatriate sportspeople in France
Bissau-Guinean expatriate sportspeople in Spain
Bissau-Guinean expatriate sportspeople in Belgium
Bissau-Guinean expatriate sportspeople in Scotland
Bissau-Guinean expatriate sportspeople in Israel
Bissau-Guinean expatriate sportspeople in France
Bissau-Guinean expatriate sportspeople in Albania